Bloom is a Canadian documentary film, directed by Fanie Pelletier and released in 2022. The film is a portrait of contemporary teenage girls, centering in particular on how they navigate the unique social pressures of growing up in a hyperconnected online world dominated by social media.

The film premiered in November 2022 at the Montreal International Documentary Festival, before having a commercial release in February 2023.

It received a Canadian Screen Award nomination for Best Editing in a Documentary (René Roberge) at the 11th Canadian Screen Awards in 2023.

References

External links

2022 films
2022 documentary films
Canadian documentary films
2020s Canadian films
2020s French-language films
French-language Canadian films
Quebec films